Brian Lumley (born 2 December 1937) is an English author of horror fiction. He came to prominence in the 1970s writing in the Cthulhu Mythos created by American writer H. P. Lovecraft but featuring the new character Titus Crow, and went on to greater fame in the 1980s with the best-selling Necroscope series, initially centered on character Harry Keogh, who can communicate with the spirits of the dead.

Biography
Born in County Durham, he joined the British Army's Royal Military Police and wrote stories in his spare time before retiring with the rank of Warrant Officer Class 1 in 1980 and becoming a professional writer.

In the 1970s he added to H. P. Lovecraft's Cthulhu Mythos cycle of stories, including several tales and a novel featuring the character Titus Crow. Several of his early books were published by Arkham House. Other stories pastiched Lovecraft's Dream Cycle but featured Lumley's original characters David Hero and Eldin the Wanderer. Lumley once explained the difference between his Cthulhu Mythos characters and Lovecraft's: "My guys fight back. Also, they like to have a laugh along the way."

Later works included the Necroscope series of novels, which produced spin-off series such as the Vampire World Trilogy, The Lost Years parts 1 and 2, and the E-Branch trilogy. The central protagonist of the earlier Necroscope novels appears in the anthology Harry Keogh and Other Weird Heroes. The latest entry in the Necroscope saga is The Mobius Murders.

Lumley served as president of the Horror Writers Association from 1996 to 1997. On 28 March 2010 Lumley was awarded Lifetime Achievement Award of the Horror Writers Association. He also received a World Fantasy Award for Lifetime Achievement in 2010.

Inspiration
Lumley's list of his favourite horror stories—"not complete by any means and by no means in order of preference"—includes M. R. James' "Count Magnus", Robert E. Howard's "The Black Stone", Robert W. Chambers' "The Yellow Sign" from The King in Yellow, William Hope Hodgson's "The Voice in the Night", and H. P. Lovecraft's "The Haunter of the Dark" and "The Colour Out of Space".

Bibliography
This is a list of Lumley's more notable novels and short story collections. This list of novels and short stories is not exhaustive. Lumley has had many pieces published in periodicals and other publications, sometimes as works in progress or partial works, under his own name and jointly with other writers.

The Subterranean Press edition
Necroscope (novel)
Brian Lumley's Freaks
Introduction
In the Glow Zone
Mother Love
Problem Child
The Ugly Act
Somebody Calling
A Coven of Vampires  (1998)
What Dark God?
Back Row
The Strange Years
The Kiss of the Lamia
Recognition
The Thief Immortal
Necros
The Thing from the Blasted Heath
Uzzi
Haggopian
The Picknickers
Zack Phalanx is Vlad the Impaler
The House of the Temple
Screaming Science Fiction: Horrors from Out of Space
"Snarker's Son"
"The Man Who Felt Pain"
"The Strange Years"
"No Way Home"
"The Man Who Saw No Spiders"
"Deja Viewer"
"Feasibility Study"
"Gaddy's Gloves"
"The Big 'C'"
The Taint and other novellas: Best Mythos Tales, Volume One (2007)
"Introduction"
The Horror at Oakdeene
Born of the Winds
The Fairground Horror
The Taint
Rising with Surtsey
Lord of the Worms
The House of the Temple
Haggopian and other stories (2008)
Introduction
The Caller of the Black
Haggopian
Cement Surroundings
The House of Cthulhu
The Night Sea-Maid Went Down
Name and Number
Recognition
Curse of the Golden Guardians
Aunt Hester
The Kiss of Bugg-Shash
De Marigny's Clock
Mylakhrion the Immortal
The Sister City
What Dark God?
The Statement of Henry Worthy
Dagon's Bell
The Thing from the Blasted Heath
Dylath Leen
The Mirror of Nitocris
The Second Wish
The Hymn
Synchronicity or Something
The Black Recalled
The Sorcerer's Dream
The Nonesuch and Others (2009)
Introduction
"The Thin People"
"Stilts"
The Nonesuch
The Fly-by-Nights (2011)

References

Further reading
Leigh Blackmore. Brian Lumley: A New Bibliography. Sydney: Dark Press, 1994. San Bernardino, CA: Borgo Press, 1987.
Brian Lumley and Stanley Wiater (eds). The Brian Lumley Companion. NY: Books, 2002.

External links

  (.com—newer)  (.net—older)
 "An Interview with Brian Lumley", by Robert M. Price, Nightscapes No. 5
 

1937 births
20th-century English novelists
21st-century British novelists
Cthulhu Mythos writers
English fantasy writers
English horror writers
English male novelists
Living people
People from County Durham
Royal Military Police soldiers
World Fantasy Award-winning writers